Lisa Thornhill (born September 30, 1966) is an American actress.

Early life 
On September 30, 1966, Thornhill was born in Hardinsburg, Kentucky. Thornhill's parents are J.C. Thornhill and Lynda Beauchamp Thornhill. Thornhill has a sister. Thornhill was raised around truckers.

Career 
Thornhill is best known for playing the role of Evelyn Thompson in the 2000 film The Family Man, Celeste Kane in the television series Veronica Mars, Gwen in the 2002 film Life, or Something Like It, and Agent Celia "Cie" Baxter in the television series 18 Wheels of Justice.

Filmography

Film

Television

See also 
 List of Veronica Mars episodes

References

External links
 
 Lisa Thornhill at allmovie.com
 Lisa Thornhill at tcm.com

1966 births
American film actresses
American television actresses
Living people
People from Hardinsburg, Kentucky
Actresses from Kentucky
21st-century American women